The Pumpkin Spice Latte is a coffee drink made with a mix of traditional fall spice flavors (cinnamon, nutmeg, and clove), steamed milk, espresso, and often sugar, topped with whipped cream and pumpkin pie spice. The beverage is most commonly associated with Starbucks, which first offered the drink in the fall of 2003. The popular flavor has inspired a wide range of product variations that appear on a seasonal basis.

History 
Starbucks started developing the Pumpkin Spice Latte in January 2003 following the successful introduction of winter seasonal drinks such as the Peppermint Mocha and Eggnog Latte. Starbucks' director of espresso Americas, Peter Dukes, said that "developers realized there was something special around the pumpkin flavor, especially since there wasn't anything around pumpkin at the time". The company experimented with different combinations and ratios of pumpkin to spice, ultimately deciding on a recipe with no pumpkin in it.

In the fall of 2003, the final recipe was tested in Vancouver and Washington, D.C. Sales of the drink exceeded the company's expectations: Dukes said "we couldn't keep up initially... we had to expedite inventory to the stores." The product went on sale in all U.S. Starbucks stores the following year.

Pumpkin Spice Latte became Starbucks' most popular seasonal beverage, with more than 200 million sold between its 2003 introduction and 2015. The beverage started a trend of pumpkin spice products, such as candles and air fresheners, as well as for foods as diverse as donuts, breakfast cereals, cough drops, and pasta sauce.

In August 2015, Starbucks changed the recipe to include pumpkin and remove artificial colors. The ingredients announced included a "pumpkin pie flavored syrup" made with sugar, condensed skim milk, pumpkin puree, coloring and preservative.

Nutrition 
In 2015, Starbucks reformulated the flavor to include actual pumpkins and to remove artificial coloring. In an IFT publication, Shelke said that the change was imperceptible and served only to "appease those who wanted to see real pumpkin on the list of ingredients."

Sales and marketing 
Starbucks sold more than 200 million Pumpkin Spice Lattes between its launch and 2013, generating revenue at a rate of at least $80 million a year in some seasons, and outselling products such as the Eggnog Latte and the Peppermint Mocha.

In a 2013 article published in Forbes magazine, Debra Donston-Miller wrote that "products that are available only for a limited time have a kind of built-in marketing that can grow in impact over time." 

Starbucks has worked to market to their target market of men and women ages 25 to 40, using contemporary designs and messaging. Starbucks has written that their target market represents the demographics using social media most heavily, including on Twitter, Facebook, and Instagram. In 2013, the company added a gaming element to the drink's arrival, allowing customers to "unlock" the drink at Starbucks stores nearby by ordering the drink with a code before its official sale date.

Since the introduction of the Starbucks Pumpkin Spice Latte, other companies have created Pumpkin Spice-inspired products. According to Datassential Menu Trends, restaurants' pumpkin-inspired limited-time offers were up 234 percent from 2008 to 2012, while overall limited-time menu offers grew by 143 percent over the same period." These items include pumpkin M&M's, Dunkin' Donuts pumpkin flavored coffee K-packs, and pumpkin flavored whiskey. Companies have also manufactured pumpkin spice lotion, shampoo, and candles.

The Starbucks Pumpkin Spice Latte can also be made iced or as a Frappuccino upon request at a Starbucks store. In the Fall of 2017, the company added a Chai variety of the drink called the Pumpkin Spice Chai Latte. Additionally, Starbucks also seasonally offers pumpkin spice-flavored instant coffee pouches.

According to CNBC, the Pumpkin Spice Latte is Starbucks' most popular seasonal drink, with worldwide sales of around 424 million. Forbes estimated the beverage accounted for $100 million in revenue for Starbucks in 2015.

See also

 List of squash and pumpkin dishes

References

External links
 Official product page
 
 

Starbucks
Squash and pumpkin dishes
Autumn traditions
Winter traditions
Products introduced in 2003